Marie-Christine Damas (born 9 December 1966) is a French former professional tennis player.

Damas, who comes from Brittany, reached a best ranking on tour of 130 in the world. Her best performance on the WTA Tour was a quarter-final appearance at the 1988 Clarins Open held in Paris. She twice made the second round of the Australian Open, including 1989 when she took eighth seed Claudia Kohde-Kilsch to three sets.

ITF finals

Singles (2–1)

References

External links
 
 

1966 births
Living people
French female tennis players
Sportspeople from Brittany